Miss Connecticut USA is the pageant that selects the representative for the state of Connecticut in the Miss USA pageant, and the name of the title held by its winner. The pageant is directed by Ewald Productions.

Connecticut's most successful placement was in 2013, when Erin Brady was crowned Miss USA. Connecticut's most recent placement was in 2022, when Cynthia Dias placed in the Top 12.

The current titleholder is Cynthia Dias of Wolcott, Connecticut and was crowned on April 10, 2022 at Windsor, Connecticut. Dias represented Connecticut at Miss USA 2022, she won the online vote to enter in the Top 16 and placed at the Top 12.

Gallery of titleholders

Results summary
Miss USA: Erin Brady (2013) 
1st Runners-Up: Diane Zabicki (1962), Pat Denne (1966)
4th Runner-Up: Alita Dawson (2002)
Top 10/12: Tiffany Teixeira (2016), Cynthia Dias (2022)
Top 15: Andrea Todd (1954), Joyce Trautwig (1960), Florence Mayette  (1961), Janice Shilinsky (1968), Elizabeth Wanderman  (1969), Monica Pietrzak (2009)

Connecticut holds a record of 12 placements at Miss USA.

Winners 
Color key

Notes

References

External links
Official website

Connecticut
Connecticut culture
Women in Connecticut
1952 establishments in Connecticut
Recurring events established in 1952
Annual events in Connecticut